Tayloria is a genus of air-breathing land snails, terrestrial pulmonate gastropod mollusks in the family Streptaxidae.

Distribution 
The distribution of the genus Tayloria includes East Africa:
 Tanzania

Species 
Species within the genus Tayloria include:
 Tayloria amaniensis Verdcourt - from Tanzania
 Tayloria angustistriata K. Pfeiffer - from Tanzania
 Tayloria hyalinoides Thiele - from Tanzania

References

Streptaxidae
Taxonomy articles created by Polbot